Céline Sallette (born 25 April 1980) is a French actress.

Career
In 2012, she was nominated for the César Award for Most Promising Actress for her performance in House of Tolerance.

In 2016, she was a member of the jury for the Un Certain Regard section of the 2016 Cannes Film Festival.

In 2017 she gained critical success with her interpretation of the role of "Masha" in Les Trois Soeurs by Simon Stone at Odéon-Théâtre de l'Europe

Personal life
She is in a relationship with director Laurent Laffargue, with whom she has a daughter named Alice.

Filmography

Other awards 
 2013: Prix Romy Schneider

References

External links

 

1980 births
Living people
French film actresses
French television actresses
French stage actresses
21st-century French actresses
Most Promising Actress Lumières Award winners
Chevaliers of the Ordre des Arts et des Lettres
Actresses from Bordeaux